Oneirodes carlsbergi is a species of anglerfish in the family Oneirodidae (dreamers). It takes its name from the Carlsberg Foundation, which funds scientific research.

Description

Oneirodes carlsbergi has (in females) a pointed lure (esca) protruding from its forehead; the esca has a tapering, internally pigmented, anterior appendage. It resembles Oneirodes luetkeni but can be distinguished by its large number of jaw teeth.

Habitat

It has also been found in the Banda Sea.

References

Oneirodidae
Fish described in 1932
Taxa named by Charles Tate Regan
Taxa named by Ethelwynn Trewavas